Saroj Ka Rishta  is a 2022 Indian Hindi-language Romantic comedy film directed by Abhishek Saxena and Starring Sanah Kapur, Gaurav Pandey, Kritikka Avasthi, Randeep Rai and Kumud Mishra.

Cast
Sanah Kapur as Saroj
Kumud Mishra
Gaurav Pandey
Kritikka Avasthi as Inaya
Randeep Rai
Mukesh S Bhatt

External links

References 
6.Banarasiya song Lyrics Saroj Ka Rishta Sambalpuri Song Lyrics16 september 2022